The Award Winning Country Gentlemen is an album by the progressive bluegrass band Country Gentlemen, recorded in 1972. This album features the 2nd classic lineup of the band with Charlie Waller, Doyle Lawson, Bill Emerson and Bill Yates on bass.

Track listing 

 Walkin' Down the Line (Dylan) 2:06
 The Legend of the Rebel Soldier (Moore) 2:56
 Redwood Hill (Lightfoot) 2:38
 The Fields Have Turned Brown (Stanley) 3:00 *(bonus track)
 C.G. Express (Doyle Lawson) 2:24
 Little Bessie (Traditional) 3:35
 Old Pine Tree (Grant) 3:06
 The Son of Hickory Holler's Tramp (Dallas Frazier) 2:31
 Take Me Home, Country Roads (Bill Danoff, John Denver, Taffy Nivert) 2:32
 Secret of the Waterfall (Jake Landers) 3:06
 Breakin' It Down (Bill Emerson) 2:24
 The Girl Behind the Bar (Carter Stanley) 3:01 *(bonus track)
 Get in Line Buddy (Bill Yates) 2:14
 New Freedom Bell (Osborne) 2:40

 bonus tracks added to album upon 1990 CD re-issue

Personnel 
 Charlie Waller - guitar, vocals
 Doyle Lawson - mandolin, vocals
 Bill Emerson - banjo, vocals
 Bill Yates - bass, vocals

with
Mike Auldridge - Dobro

References 

1972 albums
Rebel Records albums
The Country Gentlemen albums